Deriot Eugene Smith (c. 1910 – April 6, 1987) was an American football and wrestling coach. He served as the head football coach at Central State College—now the University of Central Oklahoma—from 1950 and 1951, compiling a career college football record of 9–10, and one conference championship. He ranks 9th all-time for Broncho coaches in winning percentage, number of games coached and victories.

Early life
Smith was born in Hillsboro, Texas, and attended Central State Teachers College in Edmond, Oklahoma, and graduated in 1934, with math and science degrees.

Central State
Smith coached the Central State wrestling team from 1936 until 1939, and again in 1946–47 before the program's 25-year hiatus. He was an assistant coach for the CSC football team and filled in as head coach while Dale E. Hamilton served during the Korean War.

Later life and death
Smith moved to California in 1958. He died at the age of 76, on April 6, 1987, in Camarillo, California.

Head coaching record

Football

References

Year of birth missing
1910s births
1987 deaths
Central Oklahoma Bronchos football coaches
Central Oklahoma Bronchos football players
Central Oklahoma Bronchos wrestlers
Central Oklahoma Bronchos wrestling coaches
People from Hillsboro, Texas